Morgan Hill, or Mammy Morgans Hill is a low mountain in Northampton County, Pennsylvania. Morgan Hill overlooks the Delaware River, and Interstate 78. It is a part of the Reading Prong of the Appalachian Mountains.

Toponymy 
Morgan Hill takes its name from Elizabeth Bell Morgan (c1759 - 1839), widow of Dr. Abel Morgan. A prominent leader in the local community, Mrs. Morgan operated a tavern atop the hill that later bore her name.

References 

Mountains of Northampton County, Pennsylvania
Mountains of Pennsylvania